The Al-Aqsa Mosque compound in the Old City of Jerusalem has four minarets in total: three on the western flank and one on the northern flank.

The four minarets

Al-Fakhariyya Minaret 

About half a year after they conquered Jerusalem (Al-Quds), defeating the Crusaders, the Mamluks built or renovated eight major minarets in the Holy City. The first minaret, known as Al-Fakhariyya Minaret, was one of the Mamluk minarets. It was built in 1278, on the junction of the southern wall and western wall at the orders of the Mamluk sultan Lajin. The minaret was built on the solid part of the wall. It was named after Fakhr al-Din al-Khalili, the father of Sharif al-Din Abd al-Rahman who supervised the building's construction. The minaret was rebuilt during the Ottoman period in 1920. 

Dating of the minarets in Jerusalem has been done according to the style and shape. Mamluk minarets generally have a square shape and surround the Haram al-Sharif. Al-Fakhariyya Minaret was built in the traditional Syrian style, with a square-shaped base and shaft, divided by moldings into three floors above which two lines of muqarnas decorate the muezzin's balcony. The niche is surrounded by a square chamber that ends in a lead-covered stone dome. After the minaret was damaged in the Jerusalem earthquake, the minaret's dome was covered with lead.

Al-Ghawanimah Minaret (Bani Ghanim Minaret) 

According to travelers and early historians, Abd al-Malik bin Marwan built the al-Ghawanimah (Bani Ghanim) Minaret. Ibn Al-Faqih al-Hamadani (3-4 AH/9-10th century AD) in his Mukhtasar Kitab and Al-Buldan and Shihab Al-Din Ahmad Ibn Muhammad Ibn 'Abd Rabbihi (3-4 AH/9-10th century AD) in his Kitab Al-Iqd Al-Farid describe the pre-Crusader Al-Aqsa enclave as having four minarets. One of them is known as the Ghawanima Minaret. It is also known as the Bani Ghanim Gate Minaret or Ghawanima Gate Minaret, the Qalawun Gate and Minaret of Saraya. It is called the minaret of the Gate of Gwanimah because it is near to the door of Ghawanima (Bab al-Ghawanima). It is named as the Minaret of the Saraya because it is located next to the Ottoman Saraya which is Al-Omariya School at the moment. The reason for naming it the minaret of the Saraya is because the minaret was renewed in al-Mansur Qalawun’s reign. 

Bani Ghanim Minaret was built at the northwestern corner of the Noble Sanctuary in 1297–98 by architect Qadi Sharaf al-Din al-Khalili, on the orders of Sultan Lajin. It has been inferred that the Ayyubids rebuilt the minaret after the Crusaders destroyed it. The Ayoubi judge Sharaf Ad-Din bin Abdul Rahman Bin As-Sahib rebuilt the Bani Ghanim Gate Minaret in 677 AH/1278 AC during the reign of Sultan Hussam Ad-Din Lajeen. It is named after Shaykh Ghanim ibn Ali ibn Husayn, who was appointed the Shaykh of the Salahiyyah Madrasah by Salahuddin Ayyubi.

It is a square-shaped minaret located near Bani Ghanim's Gate and is considered the most decorated of Al-Aqsa's minarets. With a height of 38.5 meters, it is the highest minaret inside Al-Aqsa and has a staircase of 120 steps. In other words, with six stories high, it is the tallest minaret of al-Aqsa compound. The tower is almost entirely made of stone, apart from a timber canopy over the muezzin's balcony. The upper part is octagonal, with a large number of marble columns. Because of its firm structure, the Ghawanima Minaret has been nearly untouched by earthquakes. The minaret is divided into several stories by stone molding and stalactite galleries. The first two stories are wider and form the base of the tower. The additional four stories are surmounted by a cylindrical drum and a bulbous dome. The stairway is externally located on the first two floors but becomes an internal spiral structure from the third floor until it reaches the muezzin's balcony.

The minaret is excavated into the naturally occurring layer of bedrock in the northwest corner of the Haram. It is partitioned into several 'stories' by stone molding and muqarnas (stalactite) galleries. The first two stories are wider and directly about the rock, forming the base of the tower. An additional four stories, including the muezzin's gallery, are surmounted by a circular drum and bulbous dome. The stairway is external on the first two floors but becomes an internal spiral structure until it reaches the muezzin's gallery, from which the call for prayer was performed.

The western tunnel, which was dug by the Israeli Occupation Forces, has weakened the minaret's foundations, resulting in calls for its renovation in 1422/2001. Also, the Islamic Waqf Directorate has renovated this gate after an Israeli extremist burnt it in 1998.

Chain Gate Minaret 

In 1329, Tankiz, the Mamluk governor of Syria, ordered the construction of a third minaret: the Chain Gate Minaret (Bāb al-Silsila Minaret), near the Chain Gate, on the western border of the al-Aqsa Mosque. This minaret, possibly replacing an earlier Umayyad minaret, is built in the traditional Syrian square tower type and is made entirely out of stone. Since the 16th century, it has been a tradition that the best muezzin ("reciter") of the adhan (the call to prayer) is assigned to this minaret because the first call to each of the five daily prayers is raised from it, giving the signal for the muezzins of mosques throughout Jerusalem to follow suit.

It is located next to the Zincirli (Silsile) Gate on the porches to the west of Masjid al-Aqsa. It is on a square-shaped platform with four corners and has a closed balcony, which is kept standing by stone columns. It has a ladder with 80 steps. The minaret is reached by Madrasa al-Ashrafiyya. It was repaired by the Islamic Foundation after the Jerusalem earthquake in h.1340 / m.1922.

Bab el-Silsila Minaret is bordered by Haram's main entrance. As stated in the inscriptions, its reconstruction was done by the Governor of Syria when Amir Tankiz was establishing the madrasa el-Tankiziyya. It was replaced by an Ottoman-style 'pencil point' spire, which was replaced by a smooth cutout and a semicircular dome after the dome was damaged in an earthquake in the 19th century. During the restoration of 1923-4, the existing canopy and lead coating on the dome were erected.

Tribes' Gate Minaret 

The last and most notable minaret was built in 1367: the  Minaret, near the Tribes' Gate ( Gate). It is composed of a cylindrical stone shaft (built later by the Ottomans), which springs up from a rectangular Mamluk-built base on top of a triangular transition zone. The shaft narrows above the muezzin's balcony and is dotted with circular windows, ending with a bulbous dome. The dome was reconstructed after the 1927 earthquake.

Proposed fifth minaret
There are no minarets in the eastern portion of the mosque. However, in 2006, King Abdullah II of Jordan announced his intention to build a fifth minaret overlooking the Mount of Olives. The King Hussein Minaret is planned to be the tallest structure in the Old City of Jerusalem.

References

External links
 https://archnet.org/sites/3064
 https://www.tandfonline.com/doi/abs/10.1179/peq.1887.19.2.90
 https://www.islamiclandmarks.com/

Temple Mount
Minarets